Norman Joseph Corcoran (August 15, 1931 — March 13, 2009) was a Canadian ice hockey forward.

Corcoran began his National Hockey League career with the Boston Bruins in 1949 and also played with the Detroit Red Wings and Chicago Black Hawks. He left the NHL following the 1956 season and retired from hockey in 1966. The majority of his career was spent in the American Hockey League.

Career statistics

Regular season and playoffs

External links

1931 births
2009 deaths
Boston Bruins players
Boston Olympics players
Buffalo Bisons (AHL) players
Canadian ice hockey centres
Chicago Blackhawks players
Detroit Red Wings players
Edmonton Flyers (WHL) players
Hershey Bears players
Pittsburgh Hornets players
Providence Reds players
Quebec Aces (AHL) players
St. Catharines Teepees players
Springfield Indians players
Ice hockey people from Toronto
Toronto St. Michael's Majors players
Trois-Rivières Lions (1955–1960) players